Tony Wingate (born 21 March 1955) is an English former footballer who played as a midfielder in the Football League for Colchester United.

Career

Born in Islington, London, Wingate joined Colchester United as an apprentice in 1970. He made his first-team debut and only Football League appearance on 18 March 1972 as an 88th-minute substitute for Brian Garvey, three days before his 17th birthday. With only two touches and two minutes playing time, Wingate is noted as having the shortest Colchester United first-team career. The U's would lose the match with Hartlepool United 3–2.

Wingate broke his leg in a reserve game with Southend United in March 1973, and then suffered a second break in the same place in August of the same year. Despite this, Wingate had been offered a professional contract and returned to action in January 1974, playing in reserve-team games and first-team friendlies. He was released from the club in the summer of 1974.

References

1955 births
Living people
Footballers from Islington (district)
English footballers
Association football midfielders
Colchester United F.C. players
English Football League players